All Saints Hospital may refer to:

All Saints Hospital (South Africa)
All Saints Hospital (Racine, Wisconsin)
All Saints' Hospital, Winson Green, Birmingham, England
All Saints' Hospital, Southwark, London, England
All Saints by the Hospital, a former name of All Saints' Church, Cambridge